Trachoolithus is an oogenus of dinosaur egg. It only contains the oospecies T. faticanus, found in the Lameta Formation of India and the Dushihin Formation of Mongolia.

See also 
 List of dinosaur oogenera

References

Bibliography 
 Carpenter, K. 1999. Eggs, Nests, and Baby Dinosaurs: A Look at Dinosaur Reproduction (Life of the Past). Indiana University Press, Bloomington, Indiana.

Dinosaur reproduction
Aptian life
Maastrichtian life
Cretaceous India
Fossils of India
Cretaceous Mongolia
Fossils of Mongolia
Fossil parataxa described in 1994